The Story of a Noble Family is a 2003 Chinese television series based on Zhang Henshui's novel Jinfen Shijia, directed by Li Dawei. The series was first broadcast in 2003 on China Central Television in mainland China.

Due to the success of The Story of a Noble Family (the writer was from Fenghuang County, Hunan), the major cast members were designated as "Honorary Citizens" of Fenghuang County.

Synopsis
Jin Yanxi, a young man from a noble and influential family, falls in love with a girl named Leng Qingqiu, who comes from a poor but scholarly background. They continue to date even though the difference in their respective social statuses prevents them from being together. Bai Xiuzhu, a girl from another affluent family, also falls in love with Yanxi, who rejects her and goes on to marry Qingqiu. However, Yanxi's restlessness, spoilt personality and boredom of life after marriage prompts him to have an extramarital affair with Xiuzhu. He eventually becomes distant from Qingqiu and plans on leaving her and his newborn son so that he can accompany Xiuzhu to Germany.

When the house in which Qingqiu and his son lives catches fire, Yanxi, who couldn't find them, believes his wife and son have died and collapses in sorrow and regret. After the fire, Yanxi receives a final letter from Xiuzhu saying she has left for Germany without him, to marry someone else. Yanxi leaves for the train station and imagines himself finding Qingqiu and hugging her. Unbeknownst to Yanxi, Qingqiu and their son actually survived the fire and is actually near him on a southbound train. Yanxi boards a train heading in the opposite direction after seeing that there is nothing left for him at home (his family is breaking up since his father had been robbed of his wealth and had died). The once loving couple now part ways and is unknown whether they ever reunite.

Cast
 Chen Kun as Jin Yanxi
 Dong Jie as Leng Qingqiu
 Liu Yifei as Bai Xiuzhu
 Kou Zhenhai as Jin Quan
 Wu Jing as Mrs. Jin
 Huang Meiying as Mrs. Leng
 Xu Lu as Xiaolian
 Wang Bozhao as Bai Xiongqi
 Chi Shuai as Liu Chunjiang
 Shu Yaoxuan as Song Shiqing
 Sun Ning as Wu Peifang
 Yang Peiheng as Jin Pengzhen
 Luo Shanshan as Jin Daozhi
 Shu Chang as Jin Meili
 Li Le as Ouyang Yujian
 Li Kechun as Ouyang Qian
 Shi Danjiang as Liu Shouhua
 Pan Juan as Cui Yi
 Qiao Zhenyu as Haoran
 Zhan Xiaodan as Wanxiang
 Chen Ting as Lin Jiani
 Huang Ailing as Han Ma
 Zuo Yiming as Wang Youchun
 Lin Zhe as Bi Yunbo
 Chen Zengyun as Zeng Cizhang
 Zhang Li as Xiaolan
 Zhang Jinling as Mrs. Liu
 Sun Ting as Xie Yushu
 Cheng Luan'an as Mr. Jia
 Long Mei as Laobao
 Wang Guan as A'nan
 Li Xueyan as Jiang Ma
 Li Juan as Mrs. Bai
 Zhu Tie as Jin Fengju
 Chen Jun as Jin Hesun
 Liu Qian as Jin Minzhi
 Mi Yang as Jin Runzhi
 Ma Jie as Jin Rong
 Liu Jiajia as Wang Yufen
 Tao Rong as Cheng Huiguang
 Lan Xiaoxia as Qiu Xizhen
 Yang Jing as Second mistress
 Pan Xingyi as Third mistress
 Chen Shanshan as Qiuxiang
 Yang Shu as Liu Baoshan
 Yu Tong as Chen Yufang
 Mei Lina as Xiaomei
 Sun Chenggang as He Mengxiong
 Yao Yanlin as Mr. Chai
 Huang Yongxing as Dehai
 Xie Zhijian as Liu Cizhang
 Ma Yansong as Mrs. Lin
 Li Zhaomin as Physician Liang
 Wang Yong as Li Sheng
 Xie Zhenwei as Wu Daoquan
 Yao Zhonghua as Xiaohong

References

External links
 
  The Story of a Noble Family on Sina.com

2003 Chinese television series debuts
2003 Chinese television series endings
Chinese period television series
Chinese romance television series
Television shows based on Chinese novels
Mandarin-language television shows